Gebran Gerge Bassil (born 21 June 1970) is a Lebanese politician who is the leader of the Free Patriotic Movement since 2015. A Maronite Christian, he is the son-in-law of President Michel Aoun, and has been his most senior advisor since 2005.

Born in Batroun, Bassil joined the FPM, becoming a prominent activist in it. He ran in the general election of 2005 and 2009, and was appointed as the Minister of Telecommunications in the First Cabinet of Saad Hariri. In 2011, Bassil and all ministers of the opposition announced their resignation, leading to the collapse of the government.

He subsequently held the position of Minister of Energy and Water between 2011 and 2014, as well as the Minister of Foreign Affairs and Emigrants from 2014 to 2020. He won a parliamentary seat for Batroun district and the Maronite sect in the general election in 2018. He was highly targeted in the widespread Lebanese protests which began by the end of 2019.

Bassil remains a controversial figure in the country. He is often accused of corruption, racism and nepotism, and was labeled the "most hated man in Lebanon". These claims are denied by Bassil, stating that they are part of a wider character assassination plot. He was sanctioned by the United States under the Magnitsky Act.

Early life
Bassil was born into a Maronite Christian family. He received a bachelor's degree and a master's degree in civil engineering from the American University of Beirut in 1992 and 1993 respectively.
He was a member of a number of associations: the Lebanese Red Cross and Rotary Club of Batroun, Lebanon.

Political career
Between the years of 1998 and 2005, Bassil was an activist in various positions in the Free Patriotic Movement. In 2005, he became a candidate in the general elections in the district of Batroun but did not succeed in being elected. From 2005 to 2008, Bassil was head of the Free Patriotic Movement.

He served as the Minister of telecommunications in the Lebanese cabinet led by Fouad Siniora from May 2008 to June 2009, and then as the minister of energy in the cabinet headed by Saad Hariri Bassil lost the general elections held in 2009.

Collapse of government in 2011

On 12 January 2011, the government collapsed after Bassil announced that all ten opposition ministers had resigned following months of warnings by Hezbollah that it would not remain inactive should there be indictments against the group. The New York Times suggested the resignations came after the collapse of talks between Syria and Saudi Arabia to ease tensions in Lebanon.

Minister of Energy and Water and Foreign Affairs and Emigrants
He served as the Minister of Energy and Water in the cabinet headed by Najib Mikati since June 2011, and assumed the role of Minister of Foreign Affairs and Emigrants as of February 2014. In the general election of 2018, Bassil was elected as a Member of Parliament (MP) for the Batroun-Koura-Zgharta-Bsharri electoral district.

During his tenure as the Minister of Energy and Water, he promised to provide electricity 24-hours a day; hence, he officiated a campaign to explore offshore oil and gas in the Eastern Mediterranean, and to generate power by floating electricity-generating turbines off the Lebanese coast through Turkish company Karpowership. However, the plan did not realize due to the continuous political disagreements in Lebanon.

2017 Lebanon–Saudi Arabia dispute

Lebanon's president Aoun and some Lebanese officials including Bassil believed that the abrupt resignation of Prime Minister Saad Hariri was made under coercion by Saudis and have claimed that the Saudis have kept him hostage.

This led Bassil to visit multiple European countries and meet with senior EU leaders to rally diplomatic support for Lebanon and its stability. During his European tour, he met with EU's High Representative and Vice-President of the Commission Federica Mogherini in Brussels, Turkish President Recep Tayyip Erdoğan and Minister of Foreign Affairs Mevlüt Çavuşoğlu, German FM Sigmar Gabriel, Russian FM Sergei Lavrov and French President Emmanuel Macron.

United States sanctions
On 6 November 2020, the United States Trump administration imposed sanctions on Bassil under the Global Magnitsky Human Rights Accountability Act over "systemic corruption" and ties with the Shia movement Hezbollah under Executive Order E.O. 13818. A senior U.S. official said Bassil's support for Hezbollah was "every bit of the motivation" for targeting him for sanctions. The sanctions froze all of his assets in the U.S. as well as his bank accounts in U.S. dollars. Private sector banks and U.S.-based businesses are prohibited to do business with him. He was denied access to the United States and may encounter problems getting a Schengen visa.

After the announcement, Bassil tweeted that he was "neither frightened by the sanctions nor tempted by the promises". President Michel Aoun assigned his foreign minister Charbel Wehbe to contact the United States in order to obtain evidence or necessary to take the necessary legal measures against Bassil.

In a televised speech Bassil slammed the sanctions as unjust and politically motivated, mainly for his refusal to break ties with Hezbollah. He also added that he joined the government as Foreign Minister to take advantage of diplomatic immunity, and congratulated Joe Biden for his win in the 2020 presidential election. Bassil's supporters gathered in front of his house, expressing their solidarity and sympathy for him.

The US ambassador to Lebanon Dorothy Shea suggested that Bassil "expressed willingness to break with Hezbollah on certain conditions", and that the sanctions are targeting Bassil and not the Free Patriotic Movement. This was later denied by Bassil.

Personal life
Bassil and his wife Chantal Michel Aoun have three children. His father-in-law is the current Lebanese president, the former leader and founder of the Free Patriotic Movement, Michel Aoun. On 27 September 2020, Bassil's party said he was infected with a "mild" case of COVID-19 as cases surged throughout Lebanon.

Controversies

Comments on Israel
Bassil was criticized by many Lebanese politicians after an interview in December 2017 with Al-Mayadeen in which he stated that Lebanon does not have an ideological problem with Israel.

He also said in that interview that he was not against Israel "living in security".

However, he has been an advocate for the return of Shebaa Farms, Kfarchouba Hills and the northern part of Ghajar, to be under the Lebanese authority.

Dispute with Speaker of Parliament
In January 2018, Bassil was recorded in a private meeting calling the Speaker of Parliament, Nabih Berri, a "thug". In the leaked footage, Bassil accused Berri of urging Shiite businessmen to boycott a diaspora conference organized by the Foreign Ministry in Abidjan.

Proposed citizenship changes
In March 2018, Bassil proposed amending Lebanese naturalization laws to allow citizenship to be passed from mothers onto their children. The bill drew criticism for not applying to women in marriages with men from neighbouring countries which activists argue is a violation of their rights.

Lobbying in the United States
In July 2019, a document was published, in which a consultant, Mario LaSala, mentioned that he worked on lobbying meetings between Bassil and American Senators.

Comments on foreign residents
In 2019, many users on social media, including renowned journalists, actors and politicians criticized Bassil for several tweets which targeted the foreign residents and labour force in Lebanon, such as:

Involvement in the rhetoric of Lebanese protests

In late 2019, Bassil became the subject of a popular Lebanese-language chant in the Lebanese protests. The chant was oppositional in nature, due to Bassil's close association to his father-in-law, Lebanese president Michel Aoun, as well as the public perception that Bassil profited politically by taking advantage of the country's sectarian divisions.  The lyrics to the chant, which was sung as a short melody, went as follows:

These explicit lyrics curse Bassil with a vulgar reference to his mother's genitals.  The song was sung in the street and was reproduced and parodied in various forms in popular social media posts and mass-forwarded WhatsApp messages until it was nearly ubiquitously known in Lebanon. Its rapidly spreading popularity led some social media users to dub Bassil "the most cursed politician in the world for the shortest period of time." Bassil has claimed that all these attacks are part of a wider character assassination by his opponents.

World Economic Forum in Davos
In January 2020, he attended the World Economic Forum in Davos, and when asked by Hadley Gamble regarding the trip funding, he responded that it was offered to him. In the same meeting, the Dutch foreign trade minister, Sigrid Kaag, mentioned that in her home country, "we're not allowed to have friends like that."

References

External links

1970 births
American University of Beirut alumni
Energy ministers of Lebanon
Foreign ministers of Lebanon
Free Patriotic Movement politicians
20th-century Lebanese politicians
Living people
People from Batroun District
People sanctioned under the Magnitsky Act
COVID-19 pandemic in Lebanon
Aoun family
21st-century Lebanese politicians